Eski Yakkabogʻ is an urban-type settlement in Qashqadaryo Region, Uzbekistan. It is part of Yakkabogʻ District. The town population in 2004 was 10,800 people.

References

Populated places in Qashqadaryo Region
Urban-type settlements in Uzbekistan